Charles Thuss is a Canadian public speaker and former ice hockey owner, coach and goaltender who was an All-American for Miami.

Career
Thuss began attending Miami University in 1991 and was slotted in as the team's 4th goaltender. He remained in that position for three seasons, not playing a single minute in the Redskins' goal until his senior season. It wasn't until the graduation of Richard Shulmistra and the departure of head coach George Gwozdecky that Thuss got his turn in net. In 1994, under new bench boss Mark Mazzoleni, Thuss got his chance to play and made the most of his opportunity. He became the team's starter, playing 34 of 39 games and keeping the team on the winning side more often than not. While his numbers weren't eye-popping, Thuss' performance for an undermanned Miami squad were appreciated by not only the team but most observers as well. He was named as the top goaltender for the CCHA and was a First-Team All-American, the first player in program history to receive that honor. He also received the Terry Flanagan Memorial Award for his perseverance in staying with the sport despite the lack of playing time.

Thuss was able to convert his brief college hockey experience into a professional career. He spent most of his time in the ECHL and served as a capable goaltender for several years. While playing with the Mobile Mysticks, Thuss founded his own sports equipment company, Southern Sports Supply, and operated the business for 14 years. After finishing his playing career with the Mississippi Sea Wolves, Thuss remained with the club as a coach until 2004. Since he remained in the area with his company, Thuss was able to found his own team in the wake of Hurricane Katrina with the Southern Professional Hockey League, a single-A league. The Mississippi Surge were announced in 2008 and began play the following year with Thuss remaining part owner until the end of their first season.

In 2010, Thuss returned to coaching with the US inline hockey team. He worked with the team for four years as he transitioned from sporting goods into being an investment advisor. In 2017 Thuss began his most recent venture, public speaking. Leaning on his early struggles as a goaltender, Thuss wanted to help others in the same situation get through difficult times in their lives. He continues to advocate for mental health as of 2021.

Statistics

Regular season and playoffs

Awards and honors

References

External links

1972 births
Living people
AHCA Division I men's ice hockey All-Americans
Canadian ice hockey goaltenders
Ice hockey people from Ontario
People from Lambton County
Miami RedHawks men's ice hockey players
Los Angeles Ice Dogs players
Louisiana IceGators (ECHL) players
Birmingham Bulls (ECHL) players
Mobile Mysticks players
Houston Aeros (1994–2013) players
Mississippi Sea Wolves players